Ek Aur Mahabharat (English language translation: One More Mahabharat) is an Indian television series based on the Mahabharata directed by Dr. Chandraprakash Dwivedi It was telecast on Zee TV in 1997 while Dwivedi was the channel's programming head, but was terminated after 14 episodes.

Cast
Krishna - Suraj Chaddha
Draupadi - Ashwini Kalsekar
Karn - Samar Jai Singh
 Vrushali - Rajeshwari Sachdev
Bheeshm - Surendra Pal
 Ganga - Prabha Sinha
Dhritrashtra - S. P. Dubey / Rajendra Gupta
Sanjay - Ishaan Trivedi / Lalit Parimoo
Dronachary - Jairoop Jeevan
Yudhisthir - Virendra Singh
Bheem - 
Arjun - Narendra Jha
Duryodhan - Shrivallabh Vyas
Shakuni - Prakash Dwivedi
Shon (Karn's Younger Brother) - Bakul Thakkar 
Vidur - Virendra Saxena/Lalit Tiwari
Dushashan - Ravi Jhankal
Kripacharya - Chand Dhar
Drupad - Mithilesh Chaturvedi
Adhirath - Rajendra Gupta
Ashwatthama - Ashok Lokhande
Ambalika - Asha Sharma
Gandhari - Meenal Karpe
Radha Mata - Meghna Roy
Kunti - Neena Gupta
Ambika - Poonam Jha
Dhrishtadyumna - Anup Soni
Balram - Zakir Hussain (actor)
Satyavati - Shubhangi Fawle-Latkar
Subandhu - Ravi Khanvilkar

References

Zee TV original programming
1997 Indian television series debuts
Television series based on Mahabharata
Films directed by Chandraprakash Dwivedi